Scott Endecott Perry  (born March 11, 1954) is a former American football defensive back in the National Football League. He played professionally for the Cincinnati Bengals.

Biography
Perry was born in Pleasanton, California and played prep football at Kent School in Kent, Connecticut. He played college football at Williams College.

Perry was drafted by the Cincinnati Bengals in the 5th round (147th overall) of the 1976 NFL Draft. He played four seasons with the Cincinnati Bengals, where he caught four interceptions and returned two for touchdowns.
 
After leaving the NFL, Perry became a first grade teacher at Point Fermin Elementary School in the Los Angeles Unified School District.

References

External links
 

1954 births
Living people
American football defensive backs
Cincinnati Bengals players
San Diego Chargers players
San Francisco 49ers players
Sportspeople from Alameda County, California
Williams Ephs football players
Kent School alumni
People from Pleasanton, California
Players of American football from California